The 60th Japan Record Awards was held on 30 December 2018. The Tokyo Broadcasting System Television network televised the show live from the New National Theatre Tokyo in Tokyo. This is the last Heisei-era Japan Record Awards.

Abstract 
Nogizaka46 won the Grand Prix in 60th Japan Record Awards for their song "Synchronicity", which is second time for this group. And Nogizakd46 is the second female group won twice Grand Prix of Japan Record Awards, next to AKB48.

Presents 

 Tao Tsuchiya
 Shinichiro Azumi (TBS Announcer)

Progress announcer

 Ai Eto (TBS Announcer)
 Yumi Furuya (TBS Announcer)

Radio relay host

 Kengo Komada (TBS Announcer)

Winners

Grand Prix 

 Synchronicity
 Artist: Nogizaka46
 Lyrics: Yasushi Akimoto
 Composition & arranger: Satori Shiraishi
 music supervisor: Kazuma Ikeda
 Producer: Yasushi Akimoto

Excellent Work Award 
(also the nomination for Grand Prix)

 Keyakizaka46 - Ambivalent
 Hiroshi Miyama - Igosso Tamashii
 Twice - Wake Me Up
 Sekai no Owari - Sazanka
 Kiyoshi Hikawa - Shōbu no Hanamichi
 Nogizaka46 - Synchronicity
 AKB48 - Teacher Teacher
 Daichi Miura - Be Myself
 Kana Nishino - Bedtime Story
 Da Pump - U.S.A.

Best New Artist Award 

 Yuto Tatsumi

New Artist Award 
(also the nomination for Best New Artist Award)

 Yuto Tatsumi
 STU48
 Chuning Candy
 Bish

Best Vocal Award 

 Misia

Special Award 

 Tetsuya Komuro
Southern All Stars
 Da Pump
Kenshi Yonezu

The Best Album Award 

 Kenshi Yonezu - Bootleg

Excellent Album Award 

The Beatniks - Exitentialist A Xie Xie
Wagakki Band - Otonoe
Shinobu Otake - Shinobu avec Piaf
Hikaru Utada - Hatsukoi

Recommendation Award 
Awarded by the Japan Composer's Association

 Junretsu

Achievement Award 

 Hiromi Sano
 Kazuo Shirane
 Akira Matsushima

Special Achievement Award 

Takayuki Inoue
 Yûichirô Oda
Kirin Kiki
Hideki Saijo
Norio Maeda
 Kenichiro Morioka

Composer Award 

 Manabu Marutani - The World Is Laughing at You (singer: Little Glee Monster)

Lyricist Award 

 Gorō Matsui - Koimachi Counter (singer: Hiroshi Takeshima)  & Winter storm (singer: Keisuke Yamauchi)

Arranger Award 

 Jazzin'park - If you can forgive you (singer: Leo Ieiri)

Planning Award 
Juju - I
Akiko Wada with Boys and Men Kenkyusei - Good Luck Love
Crazy Ken Band - Two People Getting Wet in the Rain
 Youichi Sugawara - Continue to sing for 60 years Looking back Beautiful memory-from 85 years old to you-
 Aya Shimazu - Singer5
Sukima Switch - Sukimanohana Taba ~ Love Song Selection ~
 Deserie - Doo Wop Nuggets Vol. 1 & Your Tender Lips - Doo Wop Nuggets Vol. 2 & That's My Desire - Doo Wop Nuggets Vol. 3

supervisor: Tatsuro Yamashita

 Kitajima Kyodai - Brother
Kiyoshi Maekawa - Maekawa Seidai Dictionary

Guests (Legend Artists)
Sayuri Yoshinaga (4th Grand Prize Laureate)
Saburō Kitajima (33rd Grand Prize Laureate)
Takashi Hosokawa (24th and 25th Grand Prize Laureate)
Pink Lady (20th Grand Prize Laureate)
Wink (31st Grand Prize Laureate)

References 

2018
Japan Record Awards
Japan Record Awards
Japan Record Awards
Japan Record Awards